Ronald Keith Siegel (January 2, 1943 – March 24, 2019) was an American psychopharmacologist who was an associate research professor in the Department of Psychiatry and Biobehavioral Sciences at the University of California, Los Angeles. Siegel was the author of several noted studies and books on psychopharmacology, hallucination, and paranoia. A native of Herkimer, New York, he received his B.A. in sociology from Brandeis University and his Ph.D. in psychology from Dalhousie University. He was affiliated with the Albert Einstein College of Medicine at Yeshiva University before joining the research faculty of UCLA in 1972, where he remained until his retirement in 2008. Throughout his career, he was a consultant to several government commissions on drug use. His research focused on the effects of drugs on human behavior, including numerous clinical studies in which human volunteers (sometimes referred to by Siegel as "psychonauts") took drugs such as ketamine, LSD, marijuana, mescaline, psilocybin, and THC.

In 2005, Siegel was an expert witness for the defense in the Robert Blake murder trial, testifying on the long-term effects of methamphetamine and cocaine use. According to the jury foreman in the trial, Siegel was "one of the most compelling witnesses" in discrediting the testimony of Ronald Hambleton, who claimed that Blake had asked him to murder Bonnie Lee Bakley.  In the course of his testimony in the Blake trial, Siegel disclosed that in one study, he had taught monkeys to smoke crack cocaine.

He died on March 24, 2019 from complications of Alzheimer's disease.

Bibliography
  (with Jolly West)
Intoxication: The Universal Drive for Mind-Altering Substances (1989, 2005)
 
Whispers: The Voices of Paranoia (1994)

Notes

American pharmacologists
Psychopharmacologists
Psychedelic drug researchers
American medical writers
American male non-fiction writers
Harvard Medical School people
David Geffen School of Medicine at UCLA faculty
Albert Einstein College of Medicine alumni
1943 births
2019 deaths